Barindermeet Singh Pahra (born 8 January 1981) is an Indian politician and a member of INC. In 2017, he was elected as the member of the Punjab Legislative Assembly from Gurdaspur.

Constituency
Singh Pahra represents the Gurdaspur. Singh Pahra won the Gurdaspur on an INC ticket, Singh Pahra beat the member of the Punjab Legislative Assembly Gurbachan Singh Babbehali of the SAD by over 28956 votes.

Political Party
Singh Pahra is from the INC and he is also the MLA of Gurdaspur.

MLA
The Aam Aadmi Party gained a strong 79% majority in the sixteenth Punjab Legislative Assembly by winning 92 out of 117 seats in the 2022 Punjab Legislative Assembly election. MP Bhagwant Mann was sworn in as Chief Minister on 16 March 2022.

Committee assignments of Punjab Legislative Assembly
Member (2022–23) Committee on Estimates

Electoral performance

References 

Living people
Indian National Congress politicians from Punjab, India
Punjab, India MLAs 2017–2022
1981 births
Punjab, India MLAs 2022–2027